Skoddetinden is a mountain in Vang Municipality in Innlandet county, Norway. The mountain has three main peaks. The tallest peak lies on the east side of the mountain and the southern peak marks the border between Vang Municipality and neighboring Hemsedal Municipality in Viken county. This peak is the northernmost point in Viken (and the old Buskerud county). The mountain is surrounded by several other notable mountains including Suletinden and Sulefjellet to the northwest; Høgeloft to the southwest; Øyre, Kljåkinnknippene, and Ørnenosi to the southeast; and Tverrfjellet to the northeast.

See also
List of mountains of Norway by height

References

Vang, Innlandet
Mountains of Innlandet